Carlos Gabutti (born 13 August 1951) is an Argentine sailor. He competed in the Star event at the 1992 Summer Olympics.

References

External links
 

1951 births
Living people
Argentine male sailors (sport)
Olympic sailors of Argentina
Sailors at the 1992 Summer Olympics – Star
Place of birth missing (living people)